Peter James Barnard-Powell (born 24 March 1951) is an English former disc jockey, popular on BBC Radio 1 in the late 1970s and 1980s, as well as a television presenter for the BBC music chart programme Top of the Pops. He has also had a second career in talent management.

Early career
Powell was educated at Uppingham School, a boys' independent school in Rutland in the English Midlands. Powell began his broadcasting career as the first voice on air when BBC Radio WM launched in 1970, and then had a brief spell on BBC Radio 1 in 1972.

He then went to Radio Luxembourg before rejoining Radio 1 in 1977. Almost immediately after his arrival at the station he made his debut as a Top of the Pops presenter, joining Radio 1 colleagues on the roster.

BBC Radio 1 career
Powell began as a weekend presenter on the station, presenting a Sunday show from 10am to 1pm, before a move to Saturdays in October 1978, again from 10am to 1pm.

In 1980 he took over the weekday afternoon show running from 3:30 to 5:30pm, before taking over the weekday teatime slot in 1981 from 5 to 7pm. The show went out from 4:30 to 7pm in 1982.

His best remembered features are 5 45s at 5.45, where Powell played five new singles, and the Record Race, in which listeners had to identify songs purely from their intros. Every Tuesday he ran through the new singles chart which had been revealed by the British Market Research Bureau (BMRB) earlier at lunchtime on BBC Radio 1 presented by Gary Davies - the first chance many young listeners got to hear the new Top 40. He also featured the album chart on Wednesday evenings.

Pete Tong – now one of Radio 1's longest-serving DJs - made his first appearance on the network on Powell's show in the early 1980s, presenting a dance music feature. Powell was an early champion of a number of successful mainstream 1980s acts, including  Spandau Ballet, Culture Club and Duran Duran as well as Australian new wave band The Church. He compered Duran Duran's charity concert at Villa Park 1983 as well as the Birmingham Heart Beat Charity Concert 1986 three years later, which featured George Harrison.

From 29 September 1984 until his departure from the station on 25 September 1988 Powell presented the weekend breakfast show from 8 to 10am. Throughout his 11-year stay at Radio 1 he became strongly associated with the Radio 1 Roadshow, which he presented each summer, and other outside broadcasts. He was also known for hosting the TV coverage of the annual Montreux Rock Festival, BBC2's Oxford Road Show and for his high-profile working relationship with fellow Radio 1 DJ Janice Long between October 1984 and July 1985.

Management
Since leaving radio he has concentrated on building his management company (James Grant Media Group) with his business partner Russ Lindsay and other financial activities, which have proved successful.

Personal life
Powell was married to Anthea Turner from 1990 to 1998.

References

1951 births
British radio personalities
British radio DJs
Living people
People educated at Uppingham School
BBC Radio 1 presenters
Radio Luxembourg (English) presenters
English television presenters
People from Stourbridge
Top of the Pops presenters